Mussaenda erythrophylla, commonly known as  Ashanti blood, red flag bush and tropical dogwood, is an evergreen West African shrub. The bracts of the shrub may have different shades, including red, rose, white, pale pink or some mixtures. Mussaenda erythrophylla grows best in warmly temperate or subtropical areas and is semideciduous in cooler parts.

The caterpillars of the Commander (Limenitis procris), a brush-footed butterfly, utilize this species as a foodplant.

References

External links
 

erythrophylla
Flora of West Tropical Africa
Taxa named by Heinrich Christian Friedrich Schumacher
Plants described in 1827